Baretta was an American detective television series that ran from 1975 to 1978.

Baretta may also refer to:

Places 
 Baretta, Punjab, or Bareta, an Indian municipality

People 
 Baretta (surname), surname

Other uses 
 Kramer Baretta, a guitar
 USS Baretta (AN-41), a U.S. Navy ship
 Baretta, members of the Rutaceae genus Helietta (flowering plants)

See also
 Barreta Island
 Barretter (disambiguation)
 Bereta (disambiguation)
 Beretta (disambiguation)
 Beretta (surname)